Stephen Austin Eubanks (October 7, 1981 – May 18, 2019) was an American motivational speaker on addiction and recovery. He was a survivor of the Columbine High School massacre, in which his best friend, 17-year-old Corey DePooter, was killed and Eubanks was shot in his hand and knee. Eubanks struggled with opioid addiction after the shooting. Eubanks was the chief operations officer for the Foundry Treatment Center. He died of a heroin overdose in 2019.

Early life and education
Eubanks was born on October 7, 1981. When he was 11, his father, an engineer, moved the family from a small town in Oklahoma to Denver. After struggling to fit in at a larger school, Eubanks's parents allowed him to attend Columbine High School out of district. He met his friend Corey DePooter at the end of their freshman year.

At age 17, Eubanks was in the library at Columbine High School on April 20, 1999, when Eric Harris and Dylan Klebold attacked the school. Eubanks ducked under his table with DePooter, another student, Jennifer Doyle, and a second unidentified student. Harris and Klebold soon entered the library and after a while, approached their table. Harris shot and injured Doyle and DePooter. Klebold shot Eubanks in his hand and knee before killing DePooter, with Eubanks witnessing his friend's death. Harris and Klebold soon after left the library and, fearing that they would return, Eubanks and other survivors fled through the library's emergency exit. Harris and Klebold would go on to kill 12 students and one teacher, injure 24 others and then die by suicide. Eubanks did not return to Columbine High School after the shooting and was instead privately tutored at home three days a week until he graduated in 2000.

Within weeks of the shooting, Eubanks developed an opioid addiction that continued into his twenties. In 2006, Eubanks recognized that he had developed tolerance for prescription medications of oxycodone (OxyContin), Adderall, and alprazolam (Xanax). He then began using cocaine, ecstasy, and alcohol. Starting in 2006, Eubanks entered residential treatment centers three times without success.

Career 
Eubanks accomplished longer-term sobriety at the age of 29 after experiencing rock bottom on April 2, 2011, when he woke up in jail without any memory of what took place. Eubanks became a motivational public speaker. From 2015 to 2019, he was the chief operations officer for the Foundry Treatment Center in Steamboat Springs. He was a member of nonprofit boards and was the operations director of NorthStar Transitions in Boulder. Eubanks was the executive director of Quiet River Transitional Recovery Community in Denver. On May 2, 2019, sixteen days before his death, Eubanks spoke at the 2019 Connecticut Opioid and Prescription Drug Prevention Conference.

Personal life 
Eubanks married at the age of 25 but divorced four years later. He had two sons from his marriage. Eubanks was engaged to Alex Dooley. On April 2, 2016, Eubanks celebrated five years of sobriety. His body was found during a welfare check on May 18, 2019, at his residence in Steamboat Springs, Colorado. He was 37. His family confirmed that he died of an overdose. It was later confirmed the overdose was heroin.

Charity 
Eubanks's family set up a memorial fund in his name to collect tax-deductible donations. In partnership with The Onsite Foundation, a nonprofit that provides counseling and emotional health education, the family launched a therapeutic program for survivors of mass violence.   The program, called Triumph Over Tragedy, was created to honor the life of Austin Eubanks, a champion for trauma-based causes and programs. His girlfriend, Laura Hutfless, helps lead the effort as a member of the foundation board.

See also
 List of deaths from drug overdose and intoxication

References

External links

1981 births
2019 deaths
Columbine High School massacre
Columbine High School alumni
American motivational speakers
American shooting survivors
People from Steamboat Springs, Colorado
Motivational speakers from Oklahoma
American chief operating officers
Drug-related deaths in Colorado
People from Denver
Deaths by heroin overdose in the United States
Crime witnesses